Margaret H. Wright (born February 18, 1944) is an American computer scientist and Mathematician.

She is the Silver Professor of Computer Science and former Chair of the Computer Science department at Courant Institute of Mathematical Sciences, New York University, with research interests in optimization, linear algebra, and scientific computing.

Early Life and Education 
Wright was born in San Francisco in 1944, and spent her early childhood in Hanford, California. Both of her parents were medical doctors. At age 10, her family moved to Tucson, Arizona, where she attended junior and high school. She graduated high school in 1960 at the age of 16. She excelled in school, especially in mathematics.

She went to college at Stanford University, one of the few top-ranked universities that accepted women at that time. She was interested in numerous subjects including literature, French, history, and mathematics, and she decided to major in mathematics thanks to some advice that a degree in mathematics would lead to better job opportunities than a degree in English or history. She planned to have a job because her mother had always worked. 

She received a B.S. degree in Mathematics from Stanford University in 1964. She completed an M.S. in Computer Science from Stanford University in 1965. 

After completing her M.S., she worked at GTE Sylvania from 1965-1971 where she wrote software to implement mathematical simulations. As part of this work, she learned about optimization methods such as the newly published Fletcher-Powell method and linear programming. At that time, it was legal for employers to discriminate against women, and she was earning significantly less than men with lower qualifications. For this and other reasons, she decided to return to Stanford in 1971 to earn her Ph.D.

Wright entered the Ph.D. program in Computer Science at Stanford University in 1971 and was supported by an assistantship from Gene H. Golub. During her Ph.D. studies, Philip E. Gill and Walter Murray, two researchers from the National Physical Laboratory (United Kingdom), came to visit and ended up having a profound impact on her Ph.D. and career. She served as a teaching assistant for a course taught by Walter Murray and go to know him. When Gill and Murray returned to the UK, she went as well for six months and did much of her dissertation research during this period. She returned to Stanford and obtaining her Ph.D. in 1976. Her thesis was on numerical methods for nonlinearly constrained optimization.

Scientific Career 
After obtaining her Ph.D. in 1976, Wright joined George Dantzig's Systems Optimization Laboratory (SOL) at Stanford University as a Senior Research Associate. She was eventually joined at SOL by Gill Murray and Philip Gill, who both moved permanently to the US, and Michael Saunders. They were known as the "Gang of Four" and published many scientific papers together, always using alphabetical order of their names. In 1984, Karmarkar's algorithm was announced as a polynomial-time algorithm for linear programs, and he came to visit Stanford and present the work. It was immediately clear to the Gang of Four and John Tomlin that this was a special case of barrier methods (the subject of Wright's thesis), and that barrier methods were much more useful than previously believed.

In 1988, Wright moved east and joined Bell Labs, where she was a Distinguished Member of the Technical Staff.  She headed the Scientific Computing Research Department from 1997-2000. She was named a Bell Labs Fellow in 1998. 

In 2001, Wright joined the Courant Institute of Mathematical Sciences as the Silver Professor of Computer Science and a professor of mathematics. She served as Chair of Computer Science from 2001-2010.

Professional Service 
She was the first female president of the Society for Industrial and Applied Mathematics (SIAM) (1995–1996). She was Editor-in-Chief of SIAM Review from 1999–2004 and Senior Editor from 2005–2010.

Awards and Recognitions 
In 1997 she was elected to the National Academy of Engineering.

In 2000 she was selected to deliver the Noether Lecture, an award of the Association for Women in Mathematics honoring “women who have made fundamental and sustained contributions to the mathematical sciences.”

In 2001 she was elected a member of the American Academy of Arts and Sciences.

In 2000 she received the SIAM Award for Distinguished Service to the Profession.

In 2002 she received the AMS Award for Distinguished Public Service.

In 2002 she became a Fellow of the Institute for Operations Research and the Management Sciences.

In 2003 she received an honorary doctorate (D. Math) from the University of Waterloo.

In 2005 she was elected to the National Academy of Sciences. 

In 2009 she became a Fellow of the Society for Industrial and Applied Mathematics (SIAM). 

In 2012 she became a fellow of the American Mathematical Society. 

In 2019 she was awarded the John von Neumann Prize "in recognition of her pioneering contributions to the numerical solution of optimization problems and to the exposition of the subject." Her prize lecture was presented at ICIAM in Valencia, Spain on July 16, 2019.

Publications 
A list of her selected publications includes

 P. E. Gill, W. Murray, and M. H. Wright, Practical Optimization, Academic Press, 1981, ISBN: 0201126494 (republished by SIAM in 2019)
 P. E. Gill, W. Murray, M. A. Saunders, J. A. Tomlin, and M. H. Wright, On projected newton barrier methods for linear programming and an equivalence to Karmarkar's projective method, Mathematical Programming, Vol. 36, No. 2, pp. 183-209, June 1986, doi:10.1007/bf02592025

 P. E. Gill, W. Murray, and M. H. Wright, Numerical Linear Algebra and Optimization, Addison-Wesley, 1991, ISBN: 0122839528 (republished by SIAM in 2021)
 M. H. Wright, Interior methods for constrained optimization, Acta Numerica, Vol. 1, pp. 341-407, January 1992, doi:10.1017/S0962492900002300
 J. C. Lagarias, J. A. Reeds, M. H. Wright, and P. E. Wright, Convergence properties of the Nelder--Mead simplex method in low dimensions, SIAM Journal on Optimization, Vol. 9, No. 1, pp. 112-147, January 1998, doi:10.1137/s1052623496303470
 A. Forsgren, P. E. Gill, and M. H. Wright, Interior Methods for Nonlinear Optimization, SIAM Review, Vol. 44, No. 4, pp. 525-597, January 2002, doi:10.1137/S0036144502414942
 M. Wright, The interior-point revolution in optimization: History, recent developments, and lasting consequences, Bulletin of the American Mathematical Society, Vol. 42, No. 1, pp. 39-56, September 2004, doi:10.1090/s0273-0979-04-01040-7

References

External links
INFORMS: Biography of Margaret Wright from the Institute for Operations Research and the Management Sciences

American women computer scientists
American computer scientists
American women mathematicians
Scientific computing researchers
Courant Institute of Mathematical Sciences faculty
Stanford University alumni
Scientists at Bell Labs
Living people
Fellows of the American Mathematical Society
Fellows of the Institute for Operations Research and the Management Sciences
Fellows of the Society for Industrial and Applied Mathematics
Members of the United States National Academy of Engineering
Members of the United States National Academy of Sciences
Presidents of the Society for Industrial and Applied Mathematics
1944 births
21st-century American women